Eresina theodori, the Theodor's eresina, is a butterfly in the family Lycaenidae. It is found in Sierra Leone, Ivory Coast, Ghana and western Nigeria. Its habitat consists of dense, primary forests.

References

Butterflies described in 1956
Poritiinae